The 1968 Coppa Italia Final was a final group of the 1967–68 Coppa Italia. From 1968 to 1971, FIGC introduced a final group instead of semi-finals and finals. In the final group, four teams played against each other home-and-away in a round-robin format. The matches were played from 13 June – 30 June 1968. The group winner was Torino.

Background 
Coppa Italia began in 1922, although the first edition didn't include the best teams and the tournament would, after one edition, pause until 1926 when it was reintroduced only to be abandon before finished. In 1935, however,  the tournament was more successfully arranged, but after seven editions it would halt due to the Second World War. It was not resumed until 1958, but has  thereafter  remained as a prestigious competition in Italian football for many decades.

Matches

Final group

References

External links
Coppa Italia 1967/68 statistics at rsssf.com
 https://www.calcio.com/calendario/ita-coppa-italia-1967-1968-finale/2/
 https://www.worldfootball.net/schedule/ita-coppa-italia-1967-1968-finale/2/

Coppa Italia Finals
Coppa Italia Final 1968